Henry Paton (12 February 1881 – 21 January 1964) was a New Zealand rugby union player, administrator and referee. He played seven matches for the All Blacks including two internationals. He also refereed at first-class level, and was a member of the management committee of the New Zealand Rugby Football Union from 1920 to 1921.

References

1881 births
1964 deaths
Rugby union players from Dunedin
People educated at Waitaki Boys' High School
New Zealand rugby union players
New Zealand international rugby union players
Otago rugby union players
Wellington rugby union players
Rugby union locks
New Zealand rugby union referees
New Zealand Rugby Football Union officials